In mathematics, a convex body in -dimensional Euclidean space  is a compact convex set with non-empty interior.

A convex body  is called symmetric if it is centrally symmetric with respect to the origin; that is to say, a point  lies in  if and only if its antipode,  also lies in  Symmetric convex bodies are in a one-to-one correspondence with the unit balls of norms on  

Important examples of convex bodies are the Euclidean ball, the hypercube and the cross-polytope.

See also

References

 

Convex geometry
Multi-dimensional geometry